Claus Johansen (born 13 March 1948) is a Danish footballer. He played in one match for the Denmark national football team in 1972.

References

External links
 

1948 births
Living people
Danish men's footballers
Denmark international footballers
Place of birth missing (living people)
Association footballers not categorized by position